The Machadinho River is a river of Rondônia state in western Brazil, a tributary of the Jiparaná River.

The river runs along the western boundary of the  Seringueira Extractive Reserve, one of a number of small sustainable use units in the region whose primary product is rubber.

See also
List of rivers of Rondônia

References

Brazilian Ministry of Transport

Rivers of Rondônia